Evi is a feminine given name.

Notable people with the name include:
 Evi Christofilopoulou (born 1956), Greek politician
 Evi Eva (born 1899–1895), German actress
 Evi Gkotzaridis (born 1969), Greek historian
 Evi Goffin (born 1981), Belgian vocalist
 Evi Hanssen (born 1978), Flemish singer and presenter
 Evi Huss (born 1974), German slalom canoer
 Evi Kratzer (born 1961), Swiss cross country skier 
 Evi Lanig (born 1933), German skier
 Evi Liivak (1924–1996), Estonian violinist 
 Evi Marandi (born 1941), Greek-Italian actress
 Evi Maltagliati (1908–1986), Italian actress
 Evi Mittermaier (born 1953), German alpine skier 
 Evi Nemeth (born 1940), American engineer, author and teacher in computer science
 Evi Edna Ogholi (born 1965), Nigerian musician
 Evi Quaid (born 1963), American film director
 Evi Rauer (1915–2004), Estonian actress
 Evi Sachenbacher-Stehle (born 1980), German cross-country skier
 Evi Sappl (born 1947), German speed skater
 Evi Tetzalidou (born 1990), Greek water polo player
 Evi Tausen (born 1981), Faroese singer
 Evi Tsamoglou (born 1978), Greek hammer thrower
 Evi Van Acker (born 1985), Belgian sailor

See also 
 Eva (name)
 Eve
 Evie (given name)

Feminine given names
Estonian feminine given names
German feminine given names
Greek feminine given names